Leire Aramendia Yerro (born 23 April 1993) is a Spanish handballer for Super Amara Bera Bera and the Spanish national team.

Achievements

Spanish League:
 Winner: 2009/10, 2010/11, 2017/18

 Copa de la Reina de Balonmano:
 Winner: 2009/10, 2010/11
 Runner-up: 2017/18

References

Living people
1993 births
Spanish female handball players
Handball players from Navarre
People from Ribera del Alto Ebro
21st-century Spanish women